Josef Hauser may refer to:

Josef Hauser (skier) (born 1940), Austrian Olympic skier
Josef Hauser (water polo) (1910–1981), German water polo player
Josef Hauser (zoologist) (1920–2004), Hungarian zoologist and priest